KXLE is a radio station located in Ellensburg, Washington, United States, operating on a frequency of 1240 kHz with a power of 1,000 watts. The AM transmitter tower is located at the station's offices and studios at 1311 Vantage Highway in Ellensburg. , the programming format of the station is news/talk, and includes the syndicated programming of Rush Limbaugh, Michael Medved, Jerry Doyle and George Noory, and carries Seattle Mariners baseball games. According to FCC ownership reports, KXLE, Inc. is owned by Sol M. Tacher of Bellevue, Washington, and his son.

History
The station signed on July 19, 1946 as KCOW. It changed its call letters to KXLE on November 27, 1946. At the time, the station was part of the Pacific Northwest Broadcasters, a group of stations owned in whole or in part by Ed Craney that also included KXLY in Spokane, KXL in Portland, Oregon, KXLF in Butte, Montana, KXLJ in Helena, Montana, KXLQ in Bozeman, Montana, KXLK in Great Falls, Montana, and KXLL in Missoula, Montana; other than KXL, and the newly-launched KXLK and KXLL, the other stations also concurrently changed their call letters to incorporate the letters "XL".

References

External links

XLE
News and talk radio stations in the United States
Kittitas County, Washington
Radio stations established in 1946
1946 establishments in Washington (state)